In physics and mathematics, supermanifolds are generalizations of the manifold concept based on ideas coming from supersymmetry. Several definitions are in use, some of which are described below.

Informal definition 
An informal definition is commonly used in physics textbooks and introductory lectures. It defines a supermanifold as a manifold with both bosonic and fermionic coordinates.  Locally, it is composed of coordinate charts that make it look like a "flat", "Euclidean" superspace. These local coordinates are often denoted by

The physical interpretation of the Grassmann-valued coordinates are the subject of debate; explicit experimental searches for supersymmetry have not yielded any positive results.  However, the use of Grassmann variables allow for the tremendous simplification of a number of important mathematical results. This includes, among other things a compact definition of functional integrals, the proper treatment of ghosts in BRST quantization, the cancellation of infinities in quantum field theory, Witten's work on the Atiyah-Singer index theorem, and more recent applications to mirror symmetry.

The use of Grassmann-valued coordinates has spawned the field of supermathematics, wherein large portions of geometry can be generalized to super-equivalents, including much of Riemannian geometry and most of the theory of Lie groups and Lie algebras (such as Lie superalgebras, etc.) However, issues remain, including the proper extension of de Rham cohomology to supermanifolds.

Definition 
Three different definitions of supermanifolds are in use.  One definition is as a sheaf over a ringed space; this is sometimes called the "algebro-geometric approach". This approach has a mathematical elegance, but can be problematic in various calculations and intuitive understanding. A second approach can be called a "concrete approach", as it is capable of simply and naturally generalizing a broad class of concepts from ordinary mathematics. It requires the use of an infinite number of supersymmetric generators in its definition; however, all but a finite number of these generators carry no content, as the concrete approach requires the use of a coarse topology that renders almost all of them equivalent. Surprisingly, these two definitions,  one with a finite number of supersymmetric generators, and one with an infinite number of generators, are equivalent.

A third approach describes a supermanifold as a base topos of a superpoint. This approach remains the topic of active research.

Algebro-geometric: as a sheaf
Although supermanifolds are special cases of noncommutative manifolds, their local structure makes them better suited to study with the tools of standard differential geometry and locally ringed spaces.

A supermanifold M of dimension (1,1) is sometimes called a super-Riemann surface.

Historically, this approach is associated with Felix Berezin, Dimitry Leites, and Bertram Kostant.

Concrete: as a smooth manifold
A different definition describes a supermanifold in a fashion that is similar to that of a smooth manifold, except that the model space  has been replaced by the model superspace .

These are given as the even and odd real subspaces of the one-dimensional space of Grassmann numbers, which, by convention, are generated by a countably infinite number of anti-commuting variables: i.e. the one-dimensional space is given by  where V is infinite-dimensional. An element z is termed real if ; real elements consisting of only an even number of Grassmann generators form the space   of c-numbers, while real elements consisting of only an odd number of Grassmann generators form the space   of a-numbers. Note that c-numbers commute, while a-numbers anti-commute.

Just as in the case of an ordinary manifold, the supermanifold is then defined as a collection of charts glued together with differentiable transition functions. This definition in terms of charts requires that the transition functions have a smooth structure and a non-vanishing Jacobian. This can only be accomplished if the individual charts use a topology that is considerably coarser than the vector-space topology on the Grassmann algebra. The resulting topology is not Hausdorff, but may be termed "projectively Hausdorff".

That this definition is equivalent to the first one is not at all obvious; however, it is the use of the coarse topology that makes it so, by rendering most of the "points" identical.  That is,  with the coarse topology is essentially isomorphic to

Properties 

Unlike a regular manifold, a supermanifold is not entirely composed of a set of points.  Instead, one takes the dual point of view that the structure of a supermanifold M is contained in its sheaf OM of "smooth functions".  In the dual point of view, an injective map corresponds to a surjection of sheaves, and a surjective map corresponds to an injection of sheaves.

An alternative approach to the dual point of view is to use the functor of points.

If M is a supermanifold of dimension (p,q), then the underlying space M inherits the structure of a differentiable manifold whose sheaf of smooth functions is OM/I, where I is the ideal generated by all odd functions.  Thus M is called the underlying space, or the body, of M.  The quotient map OM → OM/I corresponds to an injective map M → M; thus M is a submanifold of M.

Examples 

 Let M be a manifold.  The odd tangent bundle ΠTM is a supermanifold given by the sheaf Ω(M) of differential forms on M.
 More generally, let E → M be a vector bundle.  Then ΠE is a supermanifold given by the sheaf Γ(ΛE*).  In fact, Π is a functor from the category of vector bundles to the category of supermanifolds.
 Lie supergroups are examples of supermanifolds.

Batchelor's theorem

Batchelor's theorem states that every supermanifold is noncanonically isomorphic to a supermanifold of the form ΠE.  The word "noncanonically" prevents one from concluding that supermanifolds are simply glorified vector bundles; although the functor Π maps surjectively onto the isomorphism classes of supermanifolds, it is not an equivalence of categories. It was published by Marjorie Batchelor in 1979.

The proof of Batchelor's theorem relies in an essential way on the existence of a partition of unity, so it does not hold for complex or real-analytic supermanifolds.

Odd symplectic structures

Odd symplectic form 

In many physical and geometric applications, a supermanifold comes equipped with an Grassmann-odd symplectic structure. All natural geometric objects on a supermanifold are graded. In particular, the bundle of two-forms is equipped with a grading. An odd symplectic form ω on a supermanifold is a closed, odd form, inducing a non-degenerate pairing on TM. Such a supermanifold is called a P-manifold. Its graded dimension is necessarily (n,n), because the odd symplectic form induces a pairing of odd and even variables. There is a version of the Darboux theorem for P-manifolds, which allows one
to equip a P-manifold locally with a set of coordinates where the odd symplectic form ω is written as 

where  are even coordinates, and  odd coordinates. (An odd symplectic form should not be confused with a Grassmann-even symplectic form on a supermanifold. In contrast, the Darboux version of an even symplectic form is

Antibracket
Given an odd symplectic 2-form ω one may define a Poisson bracket known as the antibracket of any two functions F and G on a supermanifold by

Equipped with this bracket, the algebra of functions on a supermanifold becomes an antibracket algebra.

A coordinate transformation that preserves the antibracket is called a P-transformation.  If the Berezinian of a P-transformation is equal to one then it is called an SP-transformation.

P and SP-manifolds

Using the Darboux theorem for odd symplectic forms one can show that P-manifolds are constructed from open sets of superspaces  glued together by P-transformations.  A manifold is said to be an SP-manifold if these transition functions can be chosen to be SP-transformations.  Equivalently one may define an SP-manifold as a supermanifold with a nondegenerate odd 2-form ω and a density function  ρ such that on each coordinate patch there exist Darboux coordinates in which ρ is identically equal to one.

Laplacian
One may define a Laplacian operator Δ on an SP-manifold as the operator which takes a function H to one half of the divergence of the corresponding Hamiltonian vector field.  Explicitly one defines

.

In Darboux coordinates this definition reduces to

where xa and θa are even and odd coordinates such that

.

The Laplacian is odd and nilpotent

.

One may define the cohomology of functions H with respect to the Laplacian.  In Geometry of Batalin-Vilkovisky quantization, Albert Schwarz has proven that the integral of a function H over a Lagrangian submanifold L depends only on the cohomology class of H and on the homology class of the body of L in the body of the ambient supermanifold.

SUSY 

A pre-SUSY-structure on a supermanifold of dimension
(n,m) is an odd m-dimensional
distribution .
With such a distribution one associates
its Frobenius tensor 
(since P is odd, the skew-symmetric Frobenius
tensor is a symmetric operation).
If this tensor is non-degenerate,
e.g. lies in an open orbit of 
,
M is called a SUSY-manifold.
SUSY-structure in dimension (1, k)
is the same as odd contact structure.

See also 
Superspace
Supersymmetry
Supergeometry
Graded manifold
Batalin–Vilkovisky formalism

References 

 Joseph Bernstein, "Lectures on Supersymmetry (notes by Dennis Gaitsgory)", Quantum Field Theory program at IAS: Fall Term
 A. Schwarz, "Geometry of Batalin-Vilkovisky quantization", ArXiv hep-th/9205088
 C. Bartocci, U. Bruzzo, D. Hernandez Ruiperez, The Geometry of Supermanifolds (Kluwer, 1991) 
 L. Mangiarotti, G. Sardanashvily, Connections in Classical and Quantum Field Theory (World Scientific, 2000) 

External links 
 Super manifolds: an incomplete survey at the Manifold Atlas.

Supersymmetry
Generalized manifolds
Structures on manifolds
Mathematical physics